Francis Ford may refer to:

Francis Ford (actor) (1881–1953), American actor, writer and film director
Francis Ford (cricketer) (1866–1940), English cricketer, who played cricket in the late 19th century
Francis Ford (politician), Canadian Liberal party politician who was involved in politics in Edmonton
Francis Ford (judge) (1882–1975), United States Federal Judge from Boston, Massachusetts
Francis Thomas Ford (1877–1946), English engineer and inventor
Francis Xavier Ford (1892–1952), Roman Catholic bishop and martyr
Sir (Francis) Clare Ford (1828–1899), English diplomat

See also
Francis Ford Coppola (born 1939), American film director, producer and screenwriter
Frank Ford (disambiguation)
Frances Ford Seymour (female, 1908–1950), socialite
Francis Forde (disambiguation)